Kazan State Agricultural University, or formally, the Federal State Budgetary Educational Institution of Higher Education "Kazan State Agrarian University" is a higher educational institution in the system of training, retraining and advanced training of employees of the Russian Ministry of Agriculture, located in the city of Kazan, Tatarstan, Russia.

History
On 22 May 1922, the Kazan Institute of Agriculture and Forestry was established through the merger of the agricultural faculty of the Polytechnic Institute and the forest faculty of Kazan University. Over the past years, the structure of the institute has repeatedly changed. In different periods, training was conducted at the zootechnical faculty, fruit and vegetable, agroforestry.

References

Universities in Kazan
Agricultural universities and colleges in Russia
Educational institutions established in 1922
1922 establishments in Russia